Al Ward (October 24, 1927 – January 3, 2021) was an American football executive who served as the general manager of the New York Jets from 1975 to 1977.

Before becoming the Jets general manager, he had been the vice president of administration to Dallas Cowboys General Manager Tex Schramm. Ward began his pro football career as director of public relations for the American Football League when it was based in Dallas, Texas, from 1960 through 1962. When the league moved its offices to New York, Ward became director of public relations for the Southwest Conference and the Cotton Bowl until rejoining the AFL in 1965 as director of promotions. He joined the Cowboys after the 1965 season as director of public relations and became assistant general manager to Schramm in 1966. He was named vice-president in 1972.

After seeing Jets secretary Connie Carberg's abilities to judge players on their skills, in 1976, Ward gave her a full-time position in the scouting department and she became the NFL's first female scout in history.

References

1927 births
2021 deaths
National Football League general managers
New York Jets executives
American football executives
Sportspeople from Texas
People from Brownsville, Texas